Leucostoma is a genus of flies in the family Tachinidae.

Species
L. abbreviatum Herting, 1971
L. acirostre Reinhard, 1956
L. africanum Villeneuve, 1920
L. anthracinum (Meigen, 1824)
L. aterrimum (Villers, 1789)
L. brasilianum (Townsend, 1938)
L. crassum Kugler, 1966
L. dapsile (Reinhard, 1956)
L. edentatum Kugler, 1978
L. effrenatum Reinhard, 1956
L. engeddense Kugler, 1966
L. fallax Reinhard, 1975
L. flavicornis Zetterstedt, 1859
L. flavidipennis Macquart, 1855
L. gravipes Wulp, 1890
L. meridianum (Rondani, 1868)
L. meridionale (Townsend, 1915) 
L. neomexicana Townsend, 1892
L. nigricorpuris Mawlood, 2002
L. nimirum Reinhard, 1956
L. nudifacies Tschorsnig, 1991
L. obsidianum (Wiedemann, 1830)
L. peccator Reinhard, 1956
L. perrarum Reinhard, 1956
L. peruvianum Townsend, 1928
L. politifrons Reinhard, 1974
L. semibarbatum Tschorsnig, 1991
L. simplex (Fallén, 1815)
L. tetraptera (Meigen, 1824)
L. turonicum Dupuis, 1964
L. vapulare Reinhard, 1956
L. vegetum Reinhard, 1956

References

Phasiinae
Diptera of Europe
Diptera of North America
Tachinidae genera
Taxa named by Johann Wilhelm Meigen